Cristina Lark (born September 18) is an international actress. She completed a Master's degree at the Royal Academy of Dramatic Arts, having previously studied with Manuel Lillo and Boris Rotenstein in Barcelona at the University of São Paulo) and Celia Helena Drama School (Escola Superior de Artes Célia Helena). She became known for acting in web series such as The Bloody Mary Show and short films and creating the web series It's Not You...., later adapted to Brazilian Portuguese and translated into Não É Você..., which was nominated for the Best Ensemble Performance (Comedy) Award at the 1st Rio Web Fest. She also starred several theater productions in the UK, Spain and Brazil. Cristina is also a vlogger, best known for her YouTube channel "Produtor de Casting da Depressão".

Filmography

Web series
 2015 Não É Você... - Laura
 2014 Against The Clock - Christina
 2013 It's Not You... - Laura
 2012 The Bloody Mary Show - Bathory
 2010 Next Day Vision (pilot) - Rosa Meleño

Cinema
 2016 Ainda Estamos Aqui
 2016 Four Wise Monkeys
 2011 Lifetime Guarantee - shop assistant
 2009 Carson & Morrison - bag girl
 2008 Obitus - Marta

Theater
 2014 Who da Man?
 2013 Postcards From Medea
 2012 Macbeth - Witch
 2011 The house of Bernarda Alba - Adela
 2011 Wife for Sale - Irina
 2011 Blood Wedding - young girl
 2006 Em Transporte - Guardian
 2006 Acalanto - Holy Whore / Blue Old Lady
 2006 This Property is Condemned - Willie
 2006 The Wild Duck - Gina Ekdal
 2005 The Intruder - Ursula
 2005 Rumores... - Dona Eudoxia

Voice
 2012 Eyes On Us - voice in Portuguese (audiocue)
 2012 Dead End Kids - voice in Portuguese and Spanish

References

External links
 

Living people
21st-century Brazilian actresses
Year of birth missing (living people)